Bee Run may refer to:

Bee Run (Missouri), a stream in Missouri
Bee Run (Spring Creek), a stream in Miami County, Ohio
Bee Run (Ritchie County, West Virginia), a stream